The following is a list of spouses of current heads of state.

States recognised by the United Nations

Other states
The following states are in free association with another UN member state.

The following states control their territory and are recognised by at least one UN member state.

The following states control their territory, but are not recognised by any UN member states.

See also 
List of heads of state by diplomatic precedence
List of current foreign ministers
List of current finance ministers
List of current defence ministers
List of current interior ministers
List of current presidents of assembly
List of current presidents
List of current vice presidents
Lists of office-holders
List of current state leaders by date of assumption of office
List of state leaders by year
Lists of state leaders
List of spouses of heads of government
List of current Permanent Representatives to the United Nations

References

Spouses